Dear Alice is a 2010 Swedish drama film directed by Othman Karim starring Danny Glover, Tuva Novotny and Peter Gardiner. The film is written by Karim and Grace Maharaj-Eriksson.

Dear Alice competed at the 2010 Moscow Film Festival.

Plot
Very different lives, becomes interweaved during what seems like an ordinary day. Franzis Namazi (Danny Glover) is a newly arrived immigrant from Gambia to Sweden. He is about to give up on his little store selling African art. Karin Carlsson-Said (Tuva Novotny) is a lawyer who is about to enter a new important step in her career as a lawyer. Her husband Moses (Peter Gardiner) must send money to his hospitalized father in Uganda, but there are problems with the transaction and has issues with keeping up his work as a Social Worker. Bosse (Ulf Brunnberg)  is the TV star who finds out he has been fired off his own show and finds his young wife with another man, Håkan (Stefan Sauk) is a charming celebrity with an alcohol problem and now once again needs help from his lawyer Karin Carlsson-Said.

Cast
 Danny Glover as Franzis Namazi
 Tuva Novotny as Karin Carlsson-Said
 Stefan Sauk as Håkan Pettersson
 Regina Lund as Elisabeth Krantz
 Ulf Brunnberg as Bosse Krantz
 Peter Gardiner as Moses Said
 Meta Velander as Elsa

References

External links
 
 
 
 Moscow Film Festival

2010 films
2010s Swedish-language films
English-language Swedish films
2010s English-language films
Swedish drama films
2010 drama films
2010 multilingual films
Swedish multilingual films
2010s Swedish films